Maelbeek (French, former Dutch spelling) or Maalbeek (Dutch) is a Brussels Metro station in the City of Brussels, Belgium. Its name originates from the Maalbeek stream.

The station opened as a premetro (underground tram) station on 17 December 1969 and became a full metro station on 20 September 1976. Following the reorganisation of the Brussels Metro on 4 April 2009, it is served by lines 1 and 5, which cross Brussels from east to west.

History
/ station was inaugurated on 17 December 1969 as a premetro station (i.e. a station served by underground tramways), as part of the first underground public transport route in Belgium, which initially stretched from De Brouckère to Schuman. On 20 September 1976, this premetro line was converted into a heavy metro line, which was later split into two distinct lines on 6 October 1982: former lines 1A and 1B, both serving Maelbeek. , the lines were reorganised and renumbered 1 and 5.

2016 Brussels bombings

On 22 March 2016 at 09:11 CET, an explosion took place at / station. The bomb exploded from the second carriage of a four carriage train as it started leaving the station and heading in the direction of Arts-Loi/Kunst-Wet. The Islamic State of Iraq and the Levant released a statement claiming responsibility for the attack and branding Belgium a participant in the ongoing military intervention against ISIL. The suicide attack took place about an hour after the bombings took place in Brussels Airport. The Flemish radio and television organisation VRT officially reported 20 people were killed at the metro station, with 106 injured.

The station was closed for over a month following the attacks. On 25 April 2016, it reopened again.

Interior and art
The walls of the / platforms are decorated with white Azulejo tiles manufactured in Portugal. The visual artist  was commissioned to paint eight portraits on the walls.

Location
/ station is located under the Rue de la Loi/Wetstraat, a street best known for the many official buildings of the European Union (EU), including the European Parliament and the European Commission, as well as of the Belgian Government. One of the station's exits leads to the Rue de la Loi, with a side entrance leading to the /. The other exit leads to the /. It is located under the bridge carrying the Rue de la Loi. Nearby (also on the Chaussée d'Etterbeek) is an entrance leading to the SNCB/NMBS (heavy rail) southbound platforms of Schuman railway station. This entrance is located under the railway bridge with stairs up to the platforms.

Nearby locations
 Chapel of the Resurrection
 European Quarter
 European Parliament

References

Notes

External links
 

Brussels metro stations
Railway stations opened in 1969
City of Brussels
1969 establishments in Belgium